Moulton is a city in Appanoose County, Iowa, United States. The population was 607 at the time of the 2020 census.

History
Moulton was platted in 1867. In 1873, the Burlington and Southwestern Railway was built into the settlement.

Geography

Demographics

2010 census
As of the census of 2010, there were 605 people, 264 households, and 164 families living in the city. The racial makeup of the city was 98.3% White, 0.3% Native American, 0.5% from other races, and 0.8% from two or more races. Hispanic or Latino of any race were 0.8% of the population.

There were 264 households, of which 30.7% had children under the age of 18 living with them, 39.8% were married couples living together, 14.4% had a female householder with no husband present, 8.0% had a male householder with no wife present, and 37.9% were non-families. 34.8% of all households were made up of individuals, and 17.8% had someone living alone who was 65 years of age or older. The average household size was 2.29 and the average family size was 2.91.

The median age in the city was 42.7 years. 26.1% of residents were under the age of 18; 7% were between the ages of 18 and 24; 21.4% were from 25 to 44; 23.7% were from 45 to 64; and 22% were 65 years of age or older. The gender makeup of the city was 47.9% male and 52.1% female.

2000 census
As of the census of 2000, there were 658 people, 302 households, and 176 families living in the city. The racial makeup of the city was 97.72% White, 0.30% African American, 1.22% Native American, 0.15% Asian, and 0.61% from two or more races. Hispanic or Latino of any race were 0.15% of the population.

There were 302 households, out of which 23.8% had children under the age of 18 living with them, 45.4% were married couples living together, 8.3% had a female householder with no husband present, and 41.4% were non-families. 38.1% of all households were made up of individuals, and 18.2% had someone living alone who was 65 years of age or older. The average household size was 2.18 and the average family size was 2.88.

In the city, the population was spread out, with 22.9% under the age of 18, 9.1% from 18 to 24, 22.6% from 25 to 44, 22.0% from 45 to 64, and 23.3% who were 65 years of age or older. The median age was 42 years. For every 100 females, there were 97.6 males. For every 100 females age 18 and over, there were 98.8 males.

The median income for a household in the city was $22,692, and the median income for a family was $31,875. Males had a median income of $23,250 versus $17,353 for females. The per capita income for the city was $14,744. About 11.4% of families and 14.8% of the population were below the poverty line, including 24.8% of those under age 18 and 10.1% of those age 65 or over.

Notable people
 Claude R. Porter, government official and politician
 Nellie Walker, American sculptor
 Larry Sheets, member of Iowa House of Representatives for District 80

References

Cities in Appanoose County, Iowa
Cities in Iowa
1867 establishments in Iowa
Populated places established in 1867